"The Other Man" is the first episode of the 10th season of the British anthology television series Play of the Week. The episode was written by Giles Cooper, directed by Gordon Flemyng, and starring Michael Caine, Siân Phillips and John Thaw. It was made by Granada for the ITV network, and broadcast on 7 September 1964.

Production 
Prior to transmission, the nature of the storyline was not publicised, the only hint being the cover of that week's TV Times, which showed the image of a British passport, but with the addition of a Swastika and the German phrase "Deutsches Reich." Running in two parts from 20:00 to 20:50 and 21:05 to 22:35, with a news broadcast in between, The Other Man was at the time the longest single drama broadcast by ITV. It had a cast of over 200, including extras and 60 speaking parts.

Synopsis 
During the opening of a British army regimental museum, one person present mentally speculates on what might have happened had past events taken a different course. This alternative history follows the life of George Grant (Michael Caine), a young army officer, as Britain capitulates to Germany in 1940 to avoid bombing. There follows a Nazi-directed reorganisation of Britain's domestic and foreign policy, a brutal reconquest of India, and a gradual complicity in racial atrocities and the building of a Channel tunnel using slave labour.

Remaining a professional soldier, Grant gradually but inevitably compromises himself under the new regime, via three tests of his humanity, after accepting a posting connected to building a road from India to the Russian frontier. First he is confronted with an old friend in a Jewish working party; then he must try and execute a fellow officer for Communist treason; before finally having to denounce his former superior officer. Grant's seeking of emotional solace with a prostitute is interrupted by a Cossack attack, during which he tries to get himself killed.

He regains consciousness a year later and discovers that his shattered body has been rebuilt using the same advanced transplant surgery that is used to keep alive the leading Nazis – including Adolf Hitler – and "heroes of the Reich" like Grant himself. Rebuilt with a new leg, a new arm, new internal organs, and a new eye, he is told that the parts came from live "donors". The narrative closes with both the "real" Grant and his Nazi-serving alter ego delivering essentially the same speech about "why we are here today" at the ceremony first seen at the beginning of the play.

Cast
 Michael Caine as George Grant 
 Siân Phillips as Kate Grant 
 John Thaw as Henry Potter 
 Peter Dyneley as Major Ritter 
 Nigel Green as Company Sergeant Major Blackman 
 William Kendall as Major Norriss 
 Godfrey Quigley as Paddy Ryan 
 Vladek Sheybal as Klaus
 Maurice Quick as Major Weston
 Dennis Chinnery as Major Lewin

Production notes 
Writer Giles Cooper had himself served as a British army officer with the West Yorkshire Regiment in Burma during the Second World War. He subsequently adapted The Other Man as a novel.

The complete programme is not thought to exist, although some sequences have survived.

See also
 Axis victory in World War II

References

External links
 
 The Other Man on BFI

1964 television plays
1964 British television episodes
ITV television dramas
Lost television episodes
ITV Play of the Week
Television episodes about World War II alternate histories